Nikola Rak (born 29 August 1987) is a Croatian professional footballer who plays as a midfielder for Croatian First Football League club NK Lučko.

Club career
In June 2012 Rak signed a two-year contract with Slaven Belupo. In his debut for the club in the second qualifying round of the UEFA Europa League on 19 July 2012, he scored a hat-trick in a 6–0 victory over Portadown. Three days later, he hit a brace in a 3–0 away win against Cibalia in the first round of Prva HNL.

In 2016 Rak signed for S.League champions Warriors FC.

Career statistics

Club

Honours
Šibenik
 Croatian Second League: 2019–20

References

External links
 
 Nikola Rak at Sportnet.hr 

1987 births
Living people
Footballers from Zagreb
Association football midfielders
Croatian footballers
NK Lučko players
NK Slaven Belupo players
HNK Gorica players
Warriors FC players
NK Inter Zaprešić players
HNK Šibenik players
Croatian Football League players
First Football League (Croatia) players
Singapore Premier League players
Croatian expatriate footballers
Expatriate footballers in Singapore
Croatian expatriate sportspeople in Singapore